Andreas is a name usually given to males in Austria, Greece, Cyprus, Denmark, Armenia, Estonia, Ethiopia, Eritrea, Finland, Flanders, Germany, Norway, Sweden, Switzerland, Romania, the Netherlands, and Indonesia. The name derives from the Greek noun ἀνήρ anēr, with genitive ἀνδρός andros, which means "man". See the article on Andrew for more information. The Scandinavian name is earliest attested as antreos in a runestone from the 12th century.

The name Andrea may be used as a feminine form, but is instead the main masculine form in Italy and the canton of Ticino in Switzerland.

Given name
Andreas is a common name, and this is not a comprehensive list of articles on people named Andreas. See instead .

Surname
 Alfred T. Andreas, American publisher and historian
 Casper Andreas (born 1972), American actor and film director
 Dwayne Andreas, a businessman
 Harry Andreas
 Lisa Andreas

Places
Andreas, Isle of Man, a village and parish in the Isle of Man

See also
San Andreas (disambiguation)

References

Andreas – Dictionary of Greek and Roman Biography and Mythology.

Given names of Greek language origin
Masculine given names
Armenian masculine given names
Danish masculine given names
Dutch masculine given names
Estonian masculine given names
German masculine given names
Greek masculine given names
Norwegian masculine given names
Swedish masculine given names
Surnames from given names